Crossrail Place is a complex built in the North Dock of the West India Docks in London's Canary Wharf. It contains Canary Wharf railway station and was partly opened on 1 May 2015. Architect Magazine described Crossrail Place as an "enormous, ship-like building", and its roof is the largest timber project in the United Kingdom. It was designed by Foster + Partners and Arup. It rises from the Import Dock (North Dock) of West India Docks.

The complex has shops and a cinema, as well as a roof garden, which is open to the public. The garden includes specimens from the Eastern and Western hemispheres, organized in reference to a meridian line.

References

External links
 

2015 establishments in England
Commercial buildings completed in 2015
Foster and Partners buildings
Buildings and structures in the London Borough of Tower Hamlets
Railway buildings and structures
Canary Wharf buildings
Roof gardens
Canary Wharf
Artificial islands of England